Kongolo is a town in Tanganyika Province in the Democratic Republic of the Congo.
It is located on the west bank of the Lualaba River, the largest headstream of the Congo River. It has 62,455 inhabitants.

Namesakes 

There are plenty of other towns in Congo with the same name.

Transport 

Kongolo is served by a railway station on the national system, which bridges the Lualaba river at this point via the Kongolo Bridge. The city lies across the river from Regional Road 631 (R631), linking Kayuyu, Lubao, Kabalo, Kongolo and Nyunzu; and is also on the (much smaller) Regional Road 632 (R632).

Kongolo Massacre 
In June 2019, bishop Oscar Ngoy wa Mpanga of the diocese of Kongolo announced the initiation of the beatification process of the one Dutch and nineteen Belgian missionaries killed during the Kongolo Massacre.

See also 

 Railway stations in DRCongo

References 

Lualaba River
Populated places in Tanganyika Province